Ishi ( – March 25, 1916) was the last known member of the Native American Yahi people from the present-day state of California in the United States. The rest of the Yahi (as well as many members of their parent tribe, the Yana) were killed in the California genocide in the 19th century. Ishi, who was widely acclaimed as the "last wild Indian" in the United States, lived most of his life isolated from modern North American culture. In 1911, aged 50, he emerged at a barn and corral,  from downtown Oroville, California.

Ishi, which means "man" in the Yana language, is an adopted name. The anthropologist Alfred Kroeber gave him this name because in the Yahi culture, tradition demanded that he not speak his own name until formally introduced by another Yahi. When asked his name, he said: "I have none, because there were no people to name me," meaning that there was no other Yahi to speak his name on his behalf.

Ishi was taken in by anthropologists at the University of California, Berkeley, who both studied him and hired him as a janitor. He lived most of his remaining five years in a university building in San Francisco. His life was depicted and discussed in multiple films and books, notably the biographical account Ishi in Two Worlds published by Theodora Kroeber in 1961.

Biography

Early life

In 1865, Ishi and his family were attacked in the Three Knolls Massacre, in which 40 of their tribesmen were killed. Although 33 Yahi survived to escape, cattlemen killed about half of the survivors. The last survivors, including Ishi and his family, went into hiding for the next 44 years. Their tribe was popularly believed to be extinct. Prior to the California Gold Rush of 1848–1855, the Yahi population numbered 404 in California, but the total Yana in the larger region numbered 2,997.

The gold rush brought tens of thousands of miners and settlers to northern California, putting pressure on native populations. Gold mining damaged water supplies and killed fish; the deer left the area. The settlers brought new infectious diseases such as smallpox and measles. The northern Yana group became extinct while the central and southern groups (who later became part of Redding Rancheria) and Yahi populations dropped dramatically. Searching for food, they came into conflict with settlers, who set bounties of 50 cents per scalp and 5 dollars per head on the natives. In 1865, the settlers attacked the Yahi while they were still asleep.

Richard Burrill wrote, in Ishi Rediscovered: 
"In 1865, near the Yahi's special place, Black Rock, the waters of Mill Creek turned red at the Three Knolls Massacre. 'Sixteen' or 'seventeen' Indian fighters killed about forty Yahi, as part of a retaliatory attack for two white women and a man killed at the Workman's household on Lower Concow Creek near Oroville. Eleven of the Indian fighters that day were Robert A. Anderson, Harmon (Hi) Good, Sim Moak, Hardy Thomasson, Jack Houser, Henry Curtis, his brother Frank Curtis, as well as Tom Gore, Bill Matthews, and William Merithew. W. J. Seagraves visited the site, too, but some time after the battle had been fought.

Robert Anderson wrote, "Into the stream they leaped, but few got out alive. Instead many dead bodies floated down the rapid current." One captive Indian woman named Mariah from Big Meadows (Lake Almanor today), was one of those who did escape. The Three Knolls massacre is also described in Theodora Kroeber's Ishi in Two Worlds.

Since then more has been learned. It is estimated that with this massacre, Ishi's entire cultural group, the Yana/Yahi, may have been reduced to about sixty individuals. From 1859 to 1911, Ishi's remote band became more and more infiltrated by non-Yahi Indian representatives, such as Wintun, Nomlaki, and Pit River individuals.

In 1879, the federal government started Indian boarding schools in California. Some men from the reservations became renegades in the hills. Volunteers among the settlers and military troops carried out additional campaigns against the northern California Indian tribes during that period.

In late 1908, a group of surveyors came across the camp inhabited by two men, a middle-aged woman, and an elderly woman. These were Ishi, his uncle, his younger sister, and his mother, respectively. The former three fled while the latter hid herself in blankets to avoid detection, as she was sick and unable to flee. The surveyors ransacked the camp, and Ishi's mother died soon after his return. His sister and uncle never returned.

Arrival into European American society
After the 1908 encounter, Ishi spent three more years alone in the wilderness. Starving and with nowhere to go, Ishi, at around the age of 50, emerged on August 29, 1911, at the Charles Ward slaughterhouse back corral near Oroville, California, after forest fires in the area. He was found pre-sunset by Floyd Hefner, son of the next-door dairy owner (who was in town), who was "hanging out", and who went to harness the horses to the wagon for the ride back to Oroville, for the workers and meat deliveries. Witnessing slaughterhouse workers included Lewis "Diamond Dick" Cassings, a "drugstore cowboy".  Later, after Sheriff J.B. Webber arrived, the Sheriff directed Adolph Kessler, a nineteen-year-old slaughterhouse worker, to handcuff Ishi, who smiled and complied.

The "wild man" caught the imagination and attention of thousands of onlookers and curiosity seekers. University of California, Berkeley anthropology professors read about him and "brought him" to the Affiliated Colleges Museum (1903—1931), in an old law school building on the University of California's Affiliated Colleges campus on Parnassus Heights, San Francisco. Studied by the university, Ishi also worked as a janitor and lived at the museum for most of the remaining five years of his life.

In October 1911, Ishi, Sam Batwi, T. T. Waterman, and A. L. Kroeber, went to the Orpheum Opera House in San Francisco to see Lily Lena (Alice Mary Ann Mathilda Archer, born 1877) the "London Songbird," known for "kaleidoscopic" costume changes. Lena gave Ishi a piece of gum as a token.

On May 13, 1914, Ishi, T. T. Waterman, A.L. Kroeber, Dr. Saxton Pope, and Saxton Pope Jr. (11 years old), took Southern Pacific's Cascade Limited overnight train, from the Oakland Mole and Pier to Vina, California, on a trek in the homelands of the Deer Creek area of Tehama county, researching and mapping for the University of California, fleeing on May 30, 1914, during the Lassen Peak volcano eruption.

T.T. Waterman and A.L. Kroeber, director of the museum, studied Ishi closely over the years and interviewed him at length in an effort to reconstruct Yahi culture. He described family units, naming patterns, and the ceremonies that he knew. Much tradition had already been lost when he was growing up, as there were few older survivors in his group. He identified material items and showed the techniques by which they were made.

In February 1915, during the Panama–Pacific International Exposition, Ishi was filmed in the Sutro Forest with the actress Grace Darling for Hearst-Selig News Pictorial, No. 30.

In June 1915, for three months, Ishi lived in Berkeley with the anthropologist Thomas Talbot Waterman and his family.

In the summer of 1915, Ishi was interviewed on his native Yana language, which was recorded and studied by the linguist Edward Sapir, who had previously done work on the northern dialects.  These wax cylinders have had their sound recovered by Carl Haber's and Vitaliy Fadeyev's optical IRENE technology.

Death
Lacking acquired immunity to common diseases, Ishi was often ill. He was treated by Saxton T. Pope, a professor of medicine at UCSF. Pope became close friends with Ishi, and learned from him how to make bows and arrows in the Yahi way. He and Ishi often hunted together. Ishi died of tuberculosis on March 25, 1916. It is said that his last words were, "You stay. I go." His friends at the university tried to prevent an autopsy on Ishi's body, since Yahi tradition called for the body to remain intact. However, the doctors at the University of California medical school performed an autopsy before Waterman could prevent it.

Ishi's brain was preserved and his body cremated. His friends placed grave goods with his remains before cremation: "one of his bows, five arrows, a basket of acorn meal, a boxfull of shell bead money, a purse full of tobacco, three rings, and some obsidian flakes." Ishi's remains were interred at Mount Olivet Cemetery in Colma, California, near San Francisco. Kroeber put Ishi's preserved brain in a deerskin-wrapped Pueblo Indian pottery jar and sent it to the Smithsonian Institution in 1917. It was held there until August 10, 2000, when the Smithsonian repatriated it to the descendants of the Redding Rancheria and Pit River tribes. This was in accordance with the National Museum of the American Indian Act of 1989 (NMAI). According to Robert Fri, director of the National Museum of Natural History, "Contrary to commonly-held belief, Ishi was not the last of his kind. In carrying out the repatriation process, we learned that as a Yahi–Yana Indian his closest living descendants are the Yana people of northern California." His remains were also returned from Colma, and the tribal members intended to bury them in a secret place.

Possible multi-ethnicity

Steven Shackley of UC Berkeley learned in 1994 of a paper by Jerald Johnson, who noted morphological evidence that Ishi's facial features and height were more typical of the Wintu and Maidu. He theorized that under pressure of diminishing populations, members of groups that were once enemies had intermarried to survive. Johnson also referred to oral histories of the Wintu and Maidu that told of the tribes' intermarrying with the Yahi. The theory is still debated, and this remains unresolved.

In 1996, Shackley announced work based on a study of Ishi's projectile points and those of the northern tribes. He had found that points made by Ishi were not typical of those recovered from historical Yahi sites. Because Ishi's production was more typical of points of the Nomlaki or Wintu tribes, and markedly dissimilar to those of Yahi, Shackley suggested that Ishi had been of mixed ancestry, and related to and raised among members of another of the tribes. He based his conclusion on a study of the points made by Ishi, compared to others held by the museum from the Yahi, Nomlaki and Wintu cultures.

Among Ishi's techniques was the use of what is known as an Ishi stick, used to run long pressure flakes. This is known to be a traditional technique of the Nomlaki and Wintu tribes. Shackley suggests that Ishi learned the skill directly from a male relative of one of those tribes. These people lived in small bands, close to the Yahi. They were historically competitors with and enemies of the Yahi.

Similar case
Ishi's story has been compared to that of Ota Benga, an Mbuti pygmy from Congo. His family had died and were not given a mourning ritual. He was taken from his home and culture. During one period, he was displayed as a zoo exhibit. Ota shot himself in the heart on March 20, 1916, five days before Ishi's death.

Legacy and honors
 The Last Yahi Indian Historical landmark, Oro Quincy Highway & Oak Avenue, Oroville, CA 95966
 Ishi is revered by flintknappers as probably one of the last two native stone toolmakers in North America. His techniques are widely imitated by knappers. Ethnographic accounts of his toolmaking are considered to be the Rosetta Stone of lithic tool manufacture.
 Kroeber and Waterman's 148 wax cylinder recordings (totaling 5 hours and 41 minutes) of Ishi speaking, singing, and telling stories in the Yahi language were selected by the Library of Congress as a 2010 addition to the National Recording Registry. This is an annual selection of recordings that are "culturally, historically, or aesthetically significant".
 Writer and critic Gerald Vizenor led a campaign to have the courtyard in Dwinelle Hall at the University of California, Berkeley renamed as "Ishi Court".
 The Ishi Wilderness Area in northeastern California, believed to be the ancestral grounds of his tribe, is named in his honor.
 Ishi Giant, an exceptionally large giant sequoia discovered by naturalist Dwight M. Willard in 1993, is named in his honor.
 Ishi was the subject of a portrait relief sculpture by Thomas Marsh in his 1990 work, Called to Rise, featuring twenty such panels of noteworthy San Franciscans, on the facade of the 25-story high-rise at 235 Pine Street, San Francisco.
 Anthropologists at the University of California, Berkeley wrote a letter in 1999 apologizing for Ishi's treatment.

Representation in popular culture

Films
 Ishi: The Last of His Tribe, aired December 20, 1978, on NBC, with Eloy Casados as Ishi, written by Christopher Trumbo and Dalton Trumbo, and directed by Robert Ellis Miller.
 The Last of His Tribe (1992), with Graham Greene as Ishi, is a Home Box Office movie.
  Ishi: The Last Yahi (1992), is a documentary film by Jed Riffe.
 In Search of History: Ishi, the Last of His Kind (1998), television documentary about him.

Literature

 
 daughter-in-law of "One-Eyed" Jack Apperson, who in 1908, sacked Ishi's Yahi village
  (Young Adult Biography)
 Kroeber wrote about Ishi in two books: 
 
 A mass-market, second-hand account of Ishi's life story, published in 1961, after the death of her husband Alfred, who had worked with Ishi, but had refused to write or talk about him.
 Ishi: Last of His Tribe. Illus. Ruth Robbins. (1964). Parnassus Press, Berkeley, California.
 a juvenile fiction version of his life.
 Ishi the Last Yahi: A Documentary History (1981), edited by Robert Heizer and Theodora Kroeber, contains additional scholarly materials
 
Novels
 Othmar Franz Lang. Meine Spur löscht der Fluss (1978) (young adult novel in German)
Lawrence Holcomb. The Last Yahi: A Novel About Ishi (2000).

Stage productions
 Ishi (2008), a play written and directed by John Fisher, was performed from July 3–27, 2008, at Theatre Rhinoceros in San Francisco. The San Francisco Chronicle review said the work "is a fierce dramatic indictment of the ugliest side of California history."

Music
Depicted in the video for "Blue Train Lines," a song by Mount Kimbie and King Krule. The video follows the story of the two anthropologists falling out. One proceeds to sell all of Ishi's possessions on eBay.

Comics
 Osamu Tezuka: The story of Ishi the primitive man, (first appeared in Weekly-Shonen-Sunday, Shogakkan in Japan, issue of October 20, 1975, total 44 pages).

See also
 Ishi Wilderness, Yahi tribe lands, now a wilderness area located in the Lassen National Forest
 Uncontacted peoples
 Demasduit
 Juana Maria
 Man of the Hole

References

Further reading

 
  
  Ishi in Oroville, eight days and seven nights, August 28 to September 4, 1911.
 
 
 "All ten original sketch maps and daily field note records...from the Bancroft Library..."
 
A report prepared at the request of Senator John L. Burton to the California Research Bureau that focused on four examples of early State of California laws and policies that significantly impacted the California Indians' way of life.
 
 
 includes essays by Native Americans. 
 
 
 

 includes discussion about Ishi
 
 
recounts the author's quest to find the remains of Ishi. (In 2000, Ishi's brain was returned to the closest related tribes, who placed it with his cremated remains.)
 

 
  (2012).

External links

 
 Richard Burrill. "Synopsis of Ishi's Life", Ishi Facts Website
"A Compromise between Science and Sentiment: A Report on Ishi's Treatment at the University of California, 1911–1916", University of California, San Francisco
 
 
  (photos  of Ishi and tools made)
 
 
  
  
 
 
 

1860s births
1916 deaths
19th-century Native Americans
20th-century Native Americans
20th-century deaths from tuberculosis
Native American history of California
Last known speakers of a Native American language
Native American male artists
People from Placer County, California
People from Oroville, California
Tuberculosis deaths in California
Yana
University of California, Berkeley people
Artists from California
Janitors
Native American people from California
Hermits
Sole survivors